Juliusz is a given name. Notable people with the name include:

Juliusz Bardach (1914–2010), Polish legal historian
Juliusz Bursche (1862–1942), bishop of the Evangelical-Augsburg Church in Poland
Juliusz Bogdan Deczkowski (1924–1998), noted Polish soldier during World War II, and later an engineer and inventor
Juliusz Kaden-Bandrowski (1885–1944), Polish journalist and novelist
Juliusz Karol Kunitzer (1843–1905), Polish-German industrialist, economic activist, philanthropist, and industrial magnate of Łódź
Juliusz Kleiner (1886–1957), Polish historian and literary theorist
Juliusz Kossak (1824–1899), Polish historical painter and master illustrator who specialized in battle scenes, military portraits and horses
Juliusz Leo (1861–1918), Polish politician and academic
Juliusz Łukasiewicz (1892–1951), Polish diplomat
Juliusz Machulski (born 1955), Polish film director and screenplay writer
Juliusz Nowina-Sokolnicki (1925–2009), Polish politician
Juliusz Konstanty Ordon (1810–1887), participant of the Polish November Uprising in 1830–1831
Juliusz Petry (1890–1961), Polish writer and the first director of Polish Radio in Lwów and Wilno and, after World War II, in Wrocław
Juliusz Rómmel (1881–1967), Polish military commander and a general of the Polish Army
Juliusz Słowacki (1809–1849), Polish Romantic poet
Juliusz Schauder (1899–1943), Polish mathematician of Jewish origin
Juliusz Wertheim (1880–1928), Polish pianist, conductor and composer
Juliusz Zarębski (1854–1885), Polish composer and pianist, pupil of Franz Liszt
Juliusz Żórawski (1898–1967), Polish architect, theoretist of architecture, interior designer, professor of Politechnika Krakowska
Juliusz Żuławski (1910–1999), Polish poet, prose writer, literary critic and translator
Juliusz Zulauf (1891–1943), Polish Army major general

See also
Juliusz Słowacki Polish Grammar School
Juliusz Słowacki Theatre